"Dynamite" is a song by Irish pop vocal band Westlife. It was released on 5 July 2019 as the third single from Westlife's eleventh studio album Spectrum. It is their third single released under Universal Music Group and Virgin EMI Records. This is released on band member Shane Filan's fortieth birthday. This is written by Ed Sheeran, Steve Mac and Andrew Wyatt. Their third work released from 2019 and the 2010s decade for the group. Mac also produced the original mix and the Cahill remix of the single, his third one from Spectrum. Midnight Mix of the single were produced by Red Triangle and band member Markus Feehily. This is the second Westlife single Red Triangle co-produced while this is the first single of Westlife to be produced by Feehily and by a Westlife member.

The song peaked at number ten in the Scottish Singles Chart, number fourteen in the UK Singles Downloads and Sales Charts, number four in the Irish Homegrown Chart, number one in the Ireland Digital Songs Sales Chart and number twenty-seven in the Irish Singles Chart. This is their second number-one hit in the Ireland Digital Songs Sales Chart in 2019 and in 2010s decade after "Hello My Love". This is their 28th top ten hit in Scotland, fifth one in the 2010s decade, and the third one in 2019.

Background
"Dynamite" is the third single released from their upcoming album Spectrum and like the previous two singles from the album was written by Ed Sheeran, Steve Mac and Andrew Wyatt. Steve also produced the single, his third one from Spectrum. Remixes of "Dynamite" were produced by Red Triangle and band member Mark Feehily, marking the first time Mark has ever had a production credit on Westlife song.

In an interview, the band said, “Dynamite has got such an enchanting melody that starts off subtly and ends up quite big and euphoric. It’s about how falling in love creates such glow and light in someone’s life that it literally lights up the world around them. It’s an upbeat, fresh summer song and you could say it reflects the energy of our comeback. This is our third single that has been co-written by Ed Sheeran. It has been amazing to work with him and he really has put his stamp on our upcoming album Spectrum."

This is believed to be their one hundred and twenty-ninth original recorded song and their one hundred and ninety-seventh overall song that they released. This is the band's thirty-fifth single overall and twenty-ninth single to be released in the United Kingdom. This is their seventh time to release a third single from an album from "Flying Without Wings" (1999), "What Makes a Man" (2000), "Bop Bop Baby" (2001), "Obvious" (2004), "Amazing" (2006), and "Something Right" (2008 and in some territories only). This is their first time since their debut in 1999 ("Flying Without Wings") to have a third single before an album release. This is the thirtieth song appearance to be included in a studio album and tenth single released co-written by Steve Mac for the band. This is the sixty-ninth Westlife song and twentieth Westlife single produced by Mac. This is the first official single by Westlife not to have a physical and a CD format release. This is also the first Westlife single not to have an official single image cover for its original mix or version.

This is their tenth song title released that starts with letter D after "Don't Calm the Storm" (1999), "Dreams Come True", "Don't Get Me Wrong" (2000), "Drive (For All Time)", "Don't Let Me Go", "Don't Say It's Too Late" (2001), "Daytime Friends, Nighttime Lovers" (2002), "Desperado" (2005), and "Difference in Me" (2010). Eight of them are originals while two are covers and only "Dynamite" have become a single. This is their first single release that starts with letter "D" and a song title called "dynamite". This is also their third single for a third single release off an album with a one-worded title from "Obvious" in 2004 and "Amazing" in 2006. "Dynamite" was supposed to be the fourth one but the second single "Miss You Nights" of the Unbreakable - The Greatest Hits Vol. 1 album was cancelled and was later pushed as a promotional single outside UK and as a double a-side single with "Tonight" released as one and became the second single in the UK and Ireland in 2002. Overall, this is their tenth one-word song title single after "Unbreakable", "Tonight" (2002), "Mandy", "Obvious" (2003), "Smile" (2004), "Amazing" (2005), "Home" (2007), "Safe" (2010), and "Lighthouse" (2011). Seven are originals and three are covers. Overall, this is their twenty-fifth one-word song title with "Forever" (1999), "Close", "Soledad" (2000), "Evergreen", "Angel" (2001), "Heal",  "Home" (2003), "Clementine" (2004), "Desperado" (2005), "Easy", "If", "Solitaire" (2006), "Leaving", "Shadows" (2009), and "Chances", "Closer" (2010). Fifteen of it are originals while ten are covers.

This is their first No. 1 one-word song title single and original song and single in the Official Irish Singles Sales Chart since "Unbreakable" in 2002 and first single and song since "The Rose" in 2006. The same chart eligible week it premiered in July 2019, the single charted with their previous single "When You're Looking Like That" in the Irish Singles Chart. In the United Kingdom, it went to number fifty-four in the UK Singles Update Chart on its first week. It premiered as A-List and Record of the Week on BBC Radio 2.

The first live television performance of the single happened in The One Show on 13 September 2019.

The track was included in the disc 2 number 40 of Now That's What I Call Music! 104 to be released on 8 November 2019. It is the third time in 2019 for a Westlife single to be included in the popular compilation album after "Hello My Love", and "Better Man".

This song is in the key of D major, transposing up a minor second to Eb major for the last chorus. The vocal range of the song ranges from A2 (Shane) to Bb4 (Mark).

Music video
The official music video of "Dynamite" was premiered on the group's official YouTube and Vevo channel on 23 August 2019. The music video features footage from their concert at Dublin's Croke Park Stadium on 6 July 2019, when they appeared in front of 160,000 fans. Preview was out on 22 August 2019 on their official social accounts.  A preview of the music video was featured in the UK talk show This Morning before its full premiere as well. This is their first music video not to premiere or to premiere after more than a month of the release of the single's official audio mix.

The music video was shot in Arena Birmingham in the United Kingdom and in Croke Park in the Republic of Ireland where they performed the song live for the first time. This is the pop band's fifth official music video that features their fans after "I Lay My Love on You", "When You're Looking Like That" (2001), "Us Against the World" (2008), and "Beautiful World" (2011). While this is their ninth music video that they were on a stage or an elevated platform from "Swear It Again" (1999), "Fool Again" (2000), "My Love" (2000), "When You're Looking Like That" (2001), "Unbreakable" (2002), "When You Tell Me That You Love Me" (2005), "Us Against the World" (2008), and "Beautiful World" (2011).

Tours performed at
The Twenty Tour (2019)

Formats and track listings
Digital download / streaming
"Dynamite" – 3:32

Streaming (Spotify)
"Dynamite" – 3:32
"Hello My Love" – 3:34
"Better Man" – 3:16

Digital download / streaming
"Dynamite" (Midnight Mix) – 4:48

Streaming (Spotify)
"Dynamite" (Midnight Mix) – 4:48
"Dynamite" – 3:32

Digital download / streaming
"Dynamite" (Cahill Remix) - 3:31

Credits and personnel
Credits adapted from YouTube.

Original Mix and Cahill Remix
 Westlife (Kian Egan, Mark Feehily, Nicky Byrne, Shane Filan) – vocals, associated performer
 Ed Sheeran – songwriting
 Steve Mac – production, songwriting, keyboards, piano
 Andrew Wyatt – bass, songwriting
 Chris Laws – drums, engineering, programming
 Dann Pursey – engineering, programming
 John Hanes – mixing engineer
 Serban Ghenea – mixing
 Dave Arch – strings, arranger
 Dick Beetham – mastering
 Duncan Fuller – engineering
 Mike Horner - engineering
 Cahill - remixer

Midnight Mix
 Westlife (Kian Egan, Mark Feehily, Nicky Byrne, Shane Filan) – vocals, associated performer
 Ed Sheeran – composer, lyricist
 Steve Mac – composer, lyricist
 Andrew Wyatt – bass
 Mark Feehily – producer
 Rick Parkhouse – acoustic guitar, associated performer, programming
 George Tizzard – acoustic guitar, associated performer, programming
 Dick Beetham – mastering engineer, studio personnel
 Red Triangle – mixer, producer

Charts

Release history

References

Westlife songs
2019 singles
2019 songs
Virgin EMI Records singles
Universal Music Group singles
Song recordings produced by Steve Mac
Songs written by Andrew Wyatt
Songs written by Steve Mac
Songs written by Ed Sheeran